Nayatt Point Light is a historic lighthouse in Barrington, Rhode Island.

The current light was built of brick in 1856 and contains an 1828 keeper's house. The lighthouse was added to the National Register of Historic Places in 1988.

First light 
On May 23, 1828, the United States Congress appropriated $3,500 for a lighthouse to mark the 
narrow passage between Nayatt Point and a shoal extending from Conimicut Point." Required by law to accept the lowest bid for the project, the government was forced to enter into the contract with William Halloway and Westgate Watson for the construction regardless of the qualifications of the contractors. This obligation was confirmed by Stephen Pleasonton of the U.S. Treasury Department, confirming the authorization to enter into the contract with Halloway and Watson. The tower was poorly constructed and was difficult to navigate for the lightkeepers.

List of keepers 
This list includes known keepers, but may not be exhaustive.

See also 
 List of lighthouses in Rhode Island
 National Register of Historic Places listings in Bristol County, Rhode Island

Notes

External links

Lighthouse.cc: Nayatt Point Lighthouse information
Preservation.ri.gov: Lighthouses of Rhode Island Multiple Property Submission

Buildings and structures in Barrington, Rhode Island
Houses in Bristol County, Rhode Island
Narragansett Bay
Lighthouses completed in 1828
Lighthouses completed in 1856
Houses completed in 1828
Houses on the National Register of Historic Places in Rhode Island
Lighthouses on the National Register of Historic Places in Rhode Island
National Register of Historic Places in Bristol County, Rhode Island
Transportation buildings and structures in Bristol County, Rhode Island